Pir Fida Muhammad is a Pakistani politician who had been a member of the Provincial Assembly of Khyber Pakhtunkhwa from August 2018 till January 2023. He also served as member of the FATA tribunal from 2012 to 2015.

Political career

He was elected to the Provincial Assembly of Khyber Pakhtunkhwa as a candidate of Pakistan Tehreek-e-Insaf from Constituency PK-74 (Peshawar-IX) in 2018 Pakistani general election.

References

Living people
Pakistan Tehreek-e-Insaf MPAs (Khyber Pakhtunkhwa)
Year of birth missing (living people)